Oakland Schools (OS) is the intermediate school district serving Oakland County, Michigan in Metro Detroit. The headquarters is located in Waterford Township.

As of 2013, within Oakland County the district serves 28 local school districts, 19 public school academies, and 111 nonpublic school buildings.

History

In 1962 Oakland Schools was established.

In October 2003 the lawyer for the intermediate school district began handling Freedom of Information Act instead of the communications department of the district. This occurred after the district received criticism accusing it of withholding documents from the public. Later that month the Oakland Schools board of education removed James Redmond from his position of superintendent because he had used district funds to pay for personal flying lessons and for arranging $680,000 in buyouts. The board installed Dan Austin as acting superintendent.

Due to decreased property values, in 2009 the district announced that furloughs, layoffs, and wage freezes would occur.

References

Further reading
 "Intermediate Districts Require Immediate Reform." The Detroit News. September 22, 2003. ID: det17290884. "The Oakland Schools board plans to return money it improperly diverted from student programs. But the effort is too little, too late. And it certainly doesn't satisfy the call to reform the troubled intermediate district. The board rerouted money earmarked for special education students to build officials a swell new $30 million headquarters, opened this year. Needy students were cheated. But the board was called on its wrongheaded move and now plans to put the money back where it[...]"

External links

 Oakland Schools

Intermediate school districts in Michigan
Education in Oakland County, Michigan
Educational institutions established in 1962
1962 establishments in Michigan